Brandon Nathaniel Smith (born April 12, 2001) is an American football linebacker for the Carolina Panthers of the National Football League (NFL). He played college football at Penn State.

High School career
Smith attended Louisa County High School in Louisa, Virginia. As a senior in 2018, he was named the Gatorade Football Player of the Year for Virginia. He appeared in the 2019 Under Armour All-America Game. Smith committed to Penn State University to play college football. During his time at Louisa County High School, Smith played under legendary coach Mark Lee Fischer during his final run as head coach of the Louisa Lions football team.

College career
As a true freshman at Penn State in 2019, Smith appeared in 13 games and had 13 tackles. As a sophomore in 2020, he started all nine games, recording 37 tackles, two sacks and one interception. Smith returned as a starter his junior season in 2021.

Professional career 

Smith was drafted by the Carolina Panthers in the fourth round, 120th overall, of the 2022 NFL Draft.

References

External links
 Carolina Panthers bio
Penn State Nittany Lions bio

2001 births
Living people
Players of American football from Virginia
American football linebackers
Penn State Nittany Lions football players
People from Louisa, Virginia
Carolina Panthers players